Dove Channel may refer to:

 Dove Channel (Oliphant Islands), a narrow channel bisecting the Oliphant Islands
 Dove Channel (streaming service), a U.S. Christian-based digital streaming subscription service